Tyler Stephen Cassidy, also known as Froggy Fresh (and previously Krispy Kreme), is an American singer, songwriter, and rapper. Cassidy became known after the comedy rap music video for his song, "The Baddest", became popular on YouTube. He continued rapping until 2018, when Cassidy stepped away from his Froggy Fresh character and began a career as a singer under his real name. As of January 2023, Cassidy's FroggyFreshRap YouTube channel has over 792 thousand subscribers and 167 million video views, while his Tyler Cassidy Music channel has over 360 thousand subscribers and 40 million video views.

Career

Krispy Kreme era (2012)

"The Baddest" and online virality

Krispy Kreme uploaded the music video "The Baddest" on April 20, 2012, which quickly became popular. The video featured Krispy with a "Southern speaking" accent. The video was featured on several websites such as The Huffington Post, and others. The video for "The Baddest" had a huge spike in views after Ray William Johnson featured the video on an episode of Equals Three on May 8, 2012. Later on May 18, 2012 Andy Milonakis reviewed the follow-up single, "Haters Wanna Be Me", on Equals Three during Johnson's temporary absence from the show. The video's original upload earned over 11 million views.

After gaining popularity on the Internet, there was an intrigue behind the real identity of Krispy Kreme. Prior to explicitly revealing his identity, the only identifier behind the Krispy Kreme (later Froggy Fresh) character was the registration of his songs in the ISWC database, with "Tyler Stephen Cassidy" tagged as the composer and author. Additionally, the business entity that runs Froggy's merchandise site, Froggy Fresh LLC, was established by a "Tyler Cassidy" with the title of "Owner" with the Michigan Department of Licensing and Regulatory Affairs.

Subsequent videos and sustained online presence

Krispy Kreme would go on to release subsequent videos, all of which would become popular, and be featured on several websites such as CollegeHumor.

On May 14, 2012, Krispy Kreme released his follow up single, "Haters Wanna Be Me", which also quickly became popular. "Haters Wanna Be Me" was ranked as the No. 20 best music video of 2012, so far, by Complex. On May 31, 2012, Kreme released another song, "Best Friends", a more serious rap than the previous two, with the lyrics focusing on his friendship with Money Maker Mike and referencing the influential rapper Tupac Shakur towards the end of the song. On June 3, 2012, Kreme gave a motivational speech to his fans about chasing their dreams and openly wept throughout the video. On June 15, 2012, Kreme released his fourth song, "Girl Work It". On June 23, 2012, a new video appeared where Kreme addressed his haters. Krispy Kreme uploaded a fifth song on July 6, 2012 titled "Stolen Bikes", a song which he uploaded a preview for as well. Only four days later on July 10, 2012, Krispy Kreme released a sixth single titled "Coolest Guys". A seventh song, titled "The Fight", was uploaded on August 24, 2012. Afterwards, on September 14, he released a song called "Denzel Washington", praising the actor.

On October 2, 2012, Froggy Fresh (then still using the "Krispy Kreme" moniker) was interviewed on Tosh.0 as part of the "Web Redemption" segment. He also debuted a song featuring Daniel Tosh after the interview. Later in October, he also released "Halloween".

In November 2012, Krispy Kreme was featured in a Mashable article that listed fifteen people made famous by the internet. His eleventh song, titled "Christmas", was released on November 21, 2012. Several of Froggy's music videos feature a recurring antagonist, James.

Froggy Fresh era (2012–2018)

Money Maker (Reloaded) 
On December 3, 2012, Froggy Fresh stated on his YouTube channel that his father received a call from the Krispy Kreme doughnut company telling him that his name was trademark infringement. He also stated that he could not use any variation of the words 'Krispy' or 'Kreme' without facing legal problems. Froggy Fresh (still "Krispy Kreme" at the time) announced that he would be changing his rap name to one of the following, depending on viewer comments: Froggy Fresh, Candy Cane, Jelly Bean, Jelly Bean Jack, Lil Kuntry or White Chocolate. On December 18, 2012, Kreme officially announced that he changed his name to Froggy Fresh. Prior to changing his name to Froggy Fresh, the rapper was originally going to change his name to Jelly Bean Jack.

In December 2012, Froggy Fresh released his debut album, Money Maker (Reloaded) on the iTunes Store. The album featured new songs in addition to existing ones already on his YouTube channel.  He also announced he was going to release the music videos for the three previously unreleased songs from the album, "ER", "Mike's Mom", and "Same Old Kid". On January 9, 2013, the music video for "Same Old Kid", the rapper's first song under the name Froggy Fresh, was released. Froggy Fresh received praise for "Same Old Kid", as Barstool Sports stated "It's one thing to outlive your 15 minutes, it's quite another to change your name, content, and brand and still remain relevant." On January 26, 2013, Money Maker (Re-Loaded), debuted and peaked at No. 3 on the Billboard Comedy Album chart.

Froggy Fresh deleted all his music videos that featured the moniker "Krispy Kreme", before re-posting the videos on February 15, switching "Krispy Kreme" to "Froggy Fresh". In February 2013, Froggy released an announcement video that also included a freestyle. The music video for "Mike's Mom" was released on March 4, 2013. In March 2013, John Cena spoke about Froggy Fresh, during an interview, praising the rapper.

Dream Team
On May 21, 2013, Froggy Fresh released the single, "Dunked On", which Froggy previously revealed would appear on his second album. On September 16, 2013, Froggy Fresh uploaded an Instagram picture of him and Mike wearing NFL-themed sweaters, with the caption "Me and mike doing a new video."

On January 18, 2014, Froggy reiterated that he was working on his second album, tweeting that it would likely be released in the summer of 2014. Later in February, Froggy announced he would be starting to upload new music videos in May 2014, which began with the May 6 release of "Stolen Bikes 2", a revisit of one of his earlier hits, "Stolen Bikes". On June 19, Froggy released the music video for "Street Rangers", a song making references to the Power Rangers and Predator.

The album, confirmed to be titled Dream Team, was released in October 2014, on iTunes. On October 8, 2014, Froggy Fresh released a trailer for his second album, which featured scenes from unreleased music videos of songs in the album. The album featured 12 songs, including the already released tracks, "Dunked On", "Stolen Bikes 2", and "Street Rangers". The album included seven other original songs, titled, "Halloween II", "Reindeer Games", "Friday the 13th", "Fun Trip", "Push Me", "You Gon Get There", and "Go Kart Love". The remaining two tracks were remixes, with one being of "Halloween II", and the other of "Push Me".

Shortly after the album was released, Froggy continued music videos for the album's tracks, moving along with "Halloween II". After subsequently releasing music videos for "Reindeer Games", "Friday the 13th", and "Fun Trip", Froggy released a non-album single, as well as its music video, titled "Jimmy Butler Is Your Father". The song's lyrics center on praising Chicago Bulls basketball player Jimmy Butler, as well as the entire Bulls franchise, and extend their focus to insult the Cleveland Cavaliers, and their star small forward, LeBron James. Froggy would release the track and music video on May 9, 2015, one day after the Chicago Bulls defeated the Cleveland Cavaliers in the third game of their Eastern Conference Semi-finals series. However, the Bulls would lose their following game and end up losing their best of seven series against the Cavaliers. Froggy then released five other singles over the next few months: "Street Rangers 2", a sequel to the first Street Rangers song; "Nightmare on My Street", a spiritual successor to the first two Halloween songs; "Zombie in my Basement", in which Froggy Fresh plays board games against a slow-witted zombie; "Good Guy Shoes", in which Fresh is possessed by the titular footwear in a manner similar to Chucky from the Child's Play series, and "Stolen Bikes 3", the supposed end to the Stolen Bike series of songs.

Escape from Hood Mountain and touring 
In September 2016, Froggy Fresh pinned a comment across many of his videos, addressing the fan-expressed concern of a lack of videos since "Stolen Bikes 3", released five months prior. The comment stated that, while no releases were scheduled for Fall 2016 through Spring 2017, they did plan to release 13–15 new videos between Summer 2017 and 2020, as part of a double-disk album tentatively known as Escape from Hood Mountain. The comment went on to state that Escape from Hood Mountain will "probably be the last album for our project, as we are all starting to grow up."

On February 21, 2017, Cassidy uploaded a video on YouTube, which has since been removed from his channel, explaining the story behind the Krispy Kreme/Froggy Fresh project. In the 23-minute video, Cassidy revealed that Froggy Fresh was indeed a comedic character created after years of struggling to gain attention as a serious rap artist. Despite stating that he truly enjoyed the five years of making videos, Cassidy revealed that it eventually became boring for him and that the friends who populated his videos had gone in different directions in their respective lives. He also expressed his interest in becoming a comedic actor. Despite this statement, Froggy Fresh announced his first tour with the inaugural show held April 28, 2017 in Charlotte, North Carolina with DJ Justin Aswell. Subsequent shows in June 2017 took place in the Southeastern United States and featured Froggy Fresh alongside Money Maker Mike. Future tour dates for other areas in the U.S. were announced up to October 2017.

On February 15, 2018, Cassidy uploaded a new update video on YouTube. He stated that Escape from Hood Mountain had been completed with eighteen tracks. He uploaded the entire album for free for fans to download online.

Tyler Cassidy era (2018–present)
After releasing Escape from Hood Mountain and going on a tour, Cassidy dropped the Froggy Fresh character and persona; he additionally stopped posting to the Froggy Fresh YouTube account. Cassidy began uploading his new music onto an eponymous YouTube account that was registered in January 2018. He would go on to upload original and cover songs on the channel. Shortly thereafter, Cassidy once again became popular on the Internet, as his original "Junkie" song attracted attention on the Reddit r/videos subreddit forum. His piano balladry was particularly noted by The Daily Dot in August 2018.

In June 2019, Creative Loafing wrote, "with soft piano melodies and honestly pretty offensive lyrics, Cassidy’s internet presence today walks a drunk line between music, comedy and cringe." In October, Cassidy released a non-album track titled "Amber Guyger", named after and criticizing the police officer found guilty of murdering Botham Jean. On October 30, 2019, Cassidy released Renee, his first post-Froggy Fresh album. The album covers themes including Cassidy's relationship with his mother, his childhood, and personal issues.

Return of Froggy Fresh (2022–present) 
On June 19, 2022, Cassidy uploaded a video on the FroggyFreshRap YouTube channel titled "Froggy Fresh Basement Promo". In the video, Cassidy announced the launch of the Froggy Fresh Basement podcast, as well as his intentions to create new music videos for his main channel. The video has since been removed.

He is scheduled to fight Chris Ray Gun at the upcoming Creator Clash 2

Discography

Albums

References

External links
 

1990s births
20th-century American people
21st-century American comedians
21st-century American male musicians
21st-century American pianists
21st-century American rappers
American comedy musicians
American male actors
American male pianists
American male rappers
American male singer-songwriters
American YouTubers
Internet memes
Living people
People from Flint, Michigan
Rappers from Michigan
Singer-songwriters from Michigan
Underground rappers